Cyrtolaus is a genus of beetles in the family Carabidae, containing the following species:

 Cyrtolaus brevispina Whitehead & Ball, 1975
 Cyrtolaus furculifer Bates, 1882
 Cyrtolaus grumufer Whitehead & Ball, 1975
 Cyrtolaus lobipennis Bates, 1882
 Cyrtolaus newtoni Whitehead & Ball, 1975
 Cyrtolaus oaxacana Ball, 1991
 Cyrtolaus orizabae (Csiki, 1930)
 Cyrtolaus ricardo Whitehead & Ball, 1975
 Cyrtolaus spinicauda Bates, 1882
 Cyrtolaus subiridescens Whitehead & Ball, 1975
 Cyrtolaus whiteheadi Ball, 1991

References

Pterostichinae